Marlon Sandro (born March 8, 1977) is a retired Brazilian mixed martial artist. He has competed for Bellator, Pancrase, Shooto, and World Victory Road. He is the former King of Pancrase Featherweight Champion and former Sengoku Featherweight Champion.

Background
Sandro is from Morro de Santo Amaro, a famous slum in Rio de Janeiro, Brazil. Growing up poor, Sandro worked several jobs as a teenager. Before being introduced to Brazilian jiu-jitsu, Sandro had trained in Capoeira and also competed in surfing.

Mixed martial arts career

Early career
Sandro made his professional MMA debut in November 2004.  He fought primarily in his native Brazil, amassing an undefeated streak of 12–0 before debuting for the World Victory Road Presents: Sengoku promotion.

King of Pancrase
Sandro made his Pancrase debut at Pancrase Rising 9 against Daiki Hata. He won by unanimous decision.

Sandro next fought Miki Shida at Pancrase: Shining 2. He won by KO.

In his next fight Sandro fought for the vacant King of Pancrase Featherweight Championship against Masaya Takita. He won via unanimous decision.

Sengoku
Sandro  participated in World Victory Road's Sengoku Featherweight Championship Tournament, losing by a "must decide" decision in the semi-finals to judo specialist and former UFC veteran Michihiro Omigawa. Scores were 30–30, 30–30, 30–29 Sandro (i.e. majority draw) but the judges with draws selected Omigawa in a "must decide" decision, giving him the "must decide split decision" 2–1.

His challenged Sengoku Featherweight Champion, Masanori Kanehara at World Victory Road Presents: Sengoku 13. Sandro won via KO 38 seconds into the first round. Kanehara was sent out of the ring in a stretcher. After the fight Sandro was ranked the No. 5 Featherweight in the world by Sherdog. On a side note, Marlon weighted 166 lbs one week before the fight.

Sandro lost the Sengoku Featherweight Championship to Hatsu Hioki at World Victory Road Presents: Soul of Fight on December 30, 2010 by unanimous decision (49–47, 48–47, 48–47). Hioki dominated nearly every round of the fight, and Sandro was given a yellow card in the first round. Sandro was nearly submitted several times in the final round by a chicken wing armlock, then by an armbar.

Bellator Fighting Championships
On February 23, it was announced Sandro had signed a multi-fight deal with Bellator Fighting Championships, and will be competing in their Season Four Tournament fights. Sandro made his debut with the promotion at Bellator 46 against Genair da Silva in his quarterfinal match of the  Bellator Fighting Championships: 2011 Summer Series Featherweight Tournament. While a seemingly clear-cut decision win, Sandro won the fight on only two scorecards (via 30–27 and 29–28 scores). A third judge scored the bout 29–28 for da Silva, which resulted in a split decision victory for Sandro.

Sandro faced Nazareno Malegarie in the semifinals at Bellator 47. He dominated Malegarie, and won the fight via unanimous decision.

Sandro fought Pat Curran at Bellator 48 in the finals of the tournament. After controlling the fight with his superior striking, Sandro lost via head kick KO late in the second round.

Sandro rebounded from the first KO loss of his career by submitting fellow Brazilian Rafael Dias in the first round at Bellator 58.

In March 2012, Sandro entered the Bellator Season Six Featherweight Tournament, where he defeated Roberto Vargas by submission in the first round. In the semifinals at Bellator 64, Sandro defeated Alexandre Bezerra via split decision.  Sandro faced Daniel Mason-Straus in the tournament finals at Bellator 68.  He lost the fight via unanimous decision.

Sandro faced TUF 14 contestant Dustin Neace on November 16, 2012 at Bellator 81. Sandro won the fight via technical submission due to a rear-naked choke in the first round.

Sandro then participated in the Bellator Season Eight Featherweight Tournament at Bellator 88 on February 7, 2013, he faced Akop Stepanyan in the quarterfinal round. Sandro won the fight via majority decision. In the semifinal, Sandro faced Magomedrasul Khasbulaev at Bellator 92 and lost via third-round TKO.

Return To Pancrase
After a five-year absence, the former King of Pancrase Featherweight Champion returns at Pancrase 252: 20th Anniversary. Sandro took on Yojiro Uchimura. The fight went to a draw.

Next Sandro fought the current King of Pancrase Lightweight Champion in a Featherweight bout in the main event of Pancrase 266, but came up short losing by split decision.

Bellator return
On May 9, 2014, over a year since his last fight in Bellator, Sandro faced Chris Horodecki at Bellator 119 in Ontario, Canada. He won the fight via unanimous decision.

Championships and accomplishments
Bellator Fighting Championships
Bellator 2011 Summer Series Featherweight Tournament Runner-up
Bellator Season Six Featherweight Tournament Runner-up
World Victory Road
Sengoku Featherweight Championship (One time)
Sengoku 2009 Featherweight Grand Prix Semifinalist
Pancrase
King of Pancrase Featherweight Champion (One time)
Arena Combat Cup
ACC 1 Featherweight Tournament Winner
Sherdog
2010 All-Violence 1st Team

Mixed martial arts record

|-
|  Win
| align=center| 28–7–2
| Diego Arturo Huerto Jauregui
| Submission (arm-triangle choke)
| Shooto Brazil 74
| 
| align=center| 1
| align=center| 1:56
| Rio de Janeiro, Brazil
|
|-
|  Win
| align=center| 27–7–2
| Koyomi Matsushima
| TKO (elbows and punches)
| Pancrase 283
| 
| align=center| 1
| align=center| 2:51
| Tokyo, Japan
|
|-
|  Loss
| align=center| 26–7–2
| Mu Gyeom Choi
| Decision (unanimous)
| Road FC 029
| 
| align=center| 3
| align=center| 5:00
| Wonju, South Korea
| 
|-
|  Win
| align=center| 26–6–2
| Wanderson Michel
| Submission (shoulder injury)
| Shooto Brasil 59: Bahia
| 
| align=center| 1
| align=center| 1:19
| Bahia, Brazil
|
|-
| Draw
| align=center| 24–6–2
| Soo Chul Kim
| Draw (unanimous)
| Road FC 025
| 
| align=center| 3
| align=center| 5:00
| Wonju, South Korea
| 
|-
| Loss
| align=center| 25–6–1
| Isao Kobayashi
| Decision (split)
|  Pancrase 266
| 
| align=center|3
| align=center|5:00
| Tokyo, Japan
| 
|-
| Win
| align=center| 25–5–1 
| Chris Horodecki
| Decision (unanimous)
| Bellator 119
| 
| align=center| 3
| align=center| 5:00
| Rama, Ontario Canada
| 
|-
| Draw
| align=center| 24–5–1
| Yojiro Uchimura
| Draw (unanimous)
| Pancrase 252: 20th Anniversary
| 
| align=center| 3
| align=center| 5:00
| Yokohama, Kanagawa, Japan
| 
|-
| Loss
| align=center| 24–5
| Magomedrasul Khasbulaev
| TKO (punches)
| Bellator 92
| 
| align=center| 3
| align=center| 2:38
| Temecula, California, United States
| 
|-
| Win
| align=center| 24–4
| Akop Stepanyan
| Decision (majority)
| Bellator 88
| 
| align=center| 3
| align=center| 5:00
| Duluth, Georgia, United States
| Bellator Season Eight Featherweight Tournament Quarterfinal.
|-
| Win
| align=center| 23–4
| Dustin Neace
| Technical Submission (rear-naked choke)
| Bellator 81
| 
| align=center| 1 
| align=center| 2:05
| Kingston, Rhode Island, United States
| 
|-
| Loss
| align=center| 22–4
| Daniel Mason-Straus
| Decision (unanimous)
| Bellator 68
| 
| align=center| 3
| align=center| 5:00
| Atlantic City, New Jersey, United States
| 
|-
| Win
| align=center| 22–3
| Alexandre Bezerra
| Decision (split)
| Bellator 64
| 
| align=center| 3
| align=center| 5:00
| Windsor, Ontario, Canada
| 
|-
| Win
| align=center| 21–3
| Roberto Vargas
| Submission (rear-naked choke)
| Bellator 60
| 
| align=center| 1
| align=center| 3:35
| Hammond, Indiana, United States
| 
|-
| Win
| align=center| 20–3
| Rafael Dias
| Submission (arm triangle choke)
| Bellator 58
| 
| align=center| 1
| align=center| 3:56
| Hollywood, Florida, United States
| 
|-
| Loss
| align=center| 19–3
| Pat Curran
| KO (head kick and punches)
| Bellator 48
| 
| align=center| 2
| align=center| 4:00
| Uncasville, Connecticut, United States
| 
|-
| Win
| align=center| 19–2
| Nazareno Malegarie
| Decision (unanimous)
| Bellator 47
| 
| align=center| 3
| align=center| 5:00
| Rama, Ontario, Canada
| 
|-
| Win
| align=center| 18–2
| Genair da Silva
| Decision (split)
| Bellator 46
| 
| align=center| 3
| align=center| 5:00
| Hollywood, Florida, United States
| 
|-
| Loss
| align=center| 17–2
| Hatsu Hioki
| Decision (unanimous)
| World Victory Road Presents: Soul of Fight
| 
| align=center| 5
| align=center| 5:00
| Koto, Tokyo, Japan
| 
|-
| Win
| align=center| 17–1
| Masanori Kanehara
| KO (punch)
| World Victory Road Presents: Sengoku Raiden Championships 13
| 
| align=center| 1
| align=center| 0:38
| Sumida, Tokyo, Japan
| 
|-
| Win
| align=center| 16–1
| Tomonari Kanomata
| KO (punch)
| World Victory Road Presents: Sengoku Raiden Championships 12
| 
| align=center| 1
| align=center| 0:09
| Sumida, Tokyo, Japan
| 
|-
| Win
| align=center| 15–1
| Yuji Hoshino
| KO (punches)
| World Victory Road Presents: Sengoku 11
| 
| align=center| 1
| align=center| 2:33
| Sumida, Tokyo, Japan
| 
|-
| Loss
| align=center| 14–1
| Michihiro Omigawa
| Decision (split)
| World Victory Road Presents: Sengoku 9
| 
| align=center| 3
| align=center| 5:00
| Saitama, Saitama, Japan
| 
|-
| Win
| align=center| 14–0
| Nick Denis
| KO (punches)
| World Victory Road Presents: Sengoku 8
| 
| align=center| 1
| align=center| 0:19
| Shibuya, Tokyo, Japan
| 
|-
| Win
| align=center| 13–0
| Matt Jaggers
| Submission (standing arm-triangle choke)
| World Victory Road Presents: Sengoku 7
| 
| align=center| 2
| align=center| 2:57
| Shibuya, Tokyo, Japan
| 
|-
|  Win
| align=center| 12–0
| Masaya Takita
| Decision (unanimous)
| Pancrase: Shining 9
| 
| align=center| 3
| align=center| 5:00
| Koto, Tokyo, Japan
| 
|-
|  Win
| align=center| 11–0
| Miki Shida
| KO (flying knee and punches)
| Pancrase: Shining 2
| 
| align=center| 2
| align=center| 4:19
| Bunkyo, Tokyo, Japan
| 
|-
|  Win
| align=center| 10–0
| Daiki Hata
| Decision (unanimous)
| Pancrase: Rising 9
| 
| align=center| 3
| align=center| 5:00
| Bunkyo, Tokyo, Japan
| 
|-
|  Win
| align=center| 9–0
| Marcos dos Santos
| Decision (unanimous)
| Shooto Brazil 3: The Evolution
| 
| align=center| 3
| align=center| 5:00
| Rio de Janeiro, Brazil
| 
|-
|  Win
| align=center| 8–0
| William Vianna
| Decision (unanimous)
| Shooto: Brazil 2
| 
| align=center| 3
| align=center| 5:00
| Flamengo, Rio de Janeiro, Brazil
| 
|-
|  Win
| align=center| 7–0
| Erinaldo Rodriguez
| Decision (unanimous)
| Shooto Brazil 1: The Return
| 
| align=center| 3
| align=center| 5:00
| Flamengo, Rio de Janeiro, Brazil
| 
|-
|  Win
| align=center| 6–0
| Marcelo Ferreira
| Decision (unanimous)
| Minotauro Fights 4
| 
| align=center| 3
| align=center| 5:00
| Salvador, Bahia, Brazil
| 
|-
|  Win
| align=center| 5–0
| Alexandre Aranha
| KO (punches)
| Arena Combat Cup 2
| 
| align=center| 1
| align=center| 1:20
| Brazil
| 
|-
|  Win
| align=center| 4–0
| Fabricio Medeiros
| Decision (unanimous)
| Shooto: Brazil 8
| 
| align=center| 3
| align=center| 5:00
| Brazil
| 
|-
|  Win
| align=center| 3–0
| Orley de Oliveira
| KO (punches)
| Shooto: Brazil 7
| 
| align=center| 1
| align=center| 0:21
| Brazil
| 
|-
|  Win
| align=center| 2–0
| Antonio Carlos Lima
| Submission (triangle choke)
| Arena Combat Cup 1
| 
| align=center| 2
| align=center| N/A
| São Paulo, Brazil
| 
|-
|  Win
| align=center| 1–0
| Tatu Nunes
| Submission (rear-naked choke)
| Arena Combat Cup 1
| 
| align=center| 1
| align=center| N/A
| São Paulo, Brazil
|

See also
 List of male mixed martial artists

References

External links

Professional MMA record from Sherdog.com

Brazilian male mixed martial artists
Bantamweight mixed martial artists
Featherweight mixed martial artists
Mixed martial artists utilizing Brazilian jiu-jitsu
World Victory Road champions
Brazilian practitioners of Brazilian jiu-jitsu
People awarded a black belt in Brazilian jiu-jitsu
1977 births
Living people
Place of birth missing (living people)
Sportspeople from Rio de Janeiro (city)